Elisabeth Riegler (born 19 February 1995) is an Austrian professional racing cyclist. She rides for the No Radunion Vitalogic team.

See also
 List of 2015 UCI Women's Teams and riders

References

External links

1995 births
Living people
Austrian female cyclists
Place of birth missing (living people)
20th-century Austrian women
21st-century Austrian women